Howard G. Chua-Eoan is a Chinese American journalist and author. He was News Director for Time magazine, and is a New York Times bestselling author.

Born in Manila, Philippines, Chua-Eoan migrated to the U.S. in October 1979 at the age of 20. He received a B.A. in English from Columbia University School of General Studies, receiving the John Angus Burrell Memorial Award as the outstanding English major of 1983. A year later, he received his M.S. in Journalism from Columbia's Graduate School of Journalism.

Chua-Eoan was Assistant Managing Editor for Time and editor of "Heroes & Inspirations," of the Time 100: People of the Century issues. He has written several books under the TIME Books imprint, including "Crimes of the Century" and "Pope for a New World: Pope Francis".

In June 2013, Chua-Eoan began writing the weekly Cocktails & Carnage column for Roads & Kingdoms.

With John Hargrove, Chua-Eoan published Beneath the Surface: Killer Whales, SeaWorld, and the Truth Beyond Blackfish in 2015, which became a New York Times bestseller.

References

External links
 @hchuaeoan, Twitter

1959 births
Living people
Time (magazine) people
Columbia University School of General Studies alumni
Columbia University Graduate School of Journalism alumni
American people of Chinese descent